AM, Antes del Mediodia was a television current affairs and Argentine varieties, is issued Monday through Friday from 10:00 to 12:00. issued by Telefe. It is presented by Verónica Lozano and Leonardo Montero.

General information 
The program has a humorous majority, general interest news, current affairs. was both the success of this program that Telefe decided to create a similar program that aired afternoons of 2011 with the same presenters.

Awards
 2013 Tato awards
 Best magazine 
 Best female TV host (Verónica Lozano)

Nominations
 2013 Martín Fierro Awards
 Best male TV host (Leonardo Montero)
 Best news reporter (María Pía Shaw)

Staff 

 Presenters: Veronica Lozano and Leonardo Montero.
 Journalists: María Pía Shaw, Laura Ubfal.
 Social issues: Darío Villarruel.
 Health topics: Darío Mindlin.
 Reporters: Santiago Zeyen and María Pía Shaw.
 Humorists: rabbit puppet Pepe Pompín.
 Voices: Dalia Gutmann - (until 2012) Carla Bonfante

References

Argentine television talk shows
2000s Argentine television series
2010s Argentine television series
2006 Argentine television series debuts
2015 Argentine television series endings
Telefe original programming